Mutimir was prince of Serbia from ca. 850 until 891. He defeated the Bulgar army, allied himself with the Byzantine emperor and ruled the first Serbian Principality when the Christianization of the Serbs took place and the Eparchy of Ras was established.

He was the eldest son of Knez Vlastimir, great-great-grandson of the Unknown Archont, who managed to unite the Serb tribes into a state. He initially ruled together with his two younger brothers, but they revolted against him and he exiled them to Bulgaria, as guarantors of peace.

Background
It is thought that the rapid extension of Bulgars over Slavs to the south prompted the Serbs to unite into a state. It is known that the Serbs and Bulgars lived in peace until the invasion in 839 (the last years of Theophilos). Vlastimir united several Serbian tribes, Emperor Theophilos (r. 829–842) probably granted the Serbs independence, and they acknowledged nominal overlordship of the Emperor. The annexation of western Macedonia by the Bulgars changed the political situation, Malamir or Presian may have seen a threat in the Serb consolidation, and opted to include them in their conquest of Slav lands.

Khan Presian I of Bulgaria (r. 836–852) invades Serbian territory between 839 and 842. The Bulgars may have been threatened by the Serbs, or, perhaps, the Byzantines wanted to divert Bulgarian attention so that they could cope with the Slavic uprising in the Peloponnese. The invasion led to a 3-year war, from which Vlastimir emerged victorious; the heavily defeated Khan Presian made no territorial gains, lost many of his men, and was driven out by Vlastimir's army.

The war ended with the death of Theophilos in 842, which released Vlastimir from his obligations to the Byzantine Empire, but also gave the Bulgarians the opportunity to annex the areas of Ohrid, Bitola and Devol in 842–843.

Vlastimir continued expanding to the west, taking southeast Bosnia and northeast Herzegovina (Hum). In the meantime, Braničevo, Morava, Timok, Vardar and Podrimlje were occupied by the Bulgars.

Life

Vlastimir died sometime between 845 and 850 and his rule was divided among his three sons: Mutimir, Strojimir and Gojnik. Although they ruled in an oligarchy, Mutimir had the supreme rule, and the two brothers acted as vassals to him.

In 853 or 854, the Bulgar Army, led by Vladimir, the son of Boris I of Bulgaria, invaded Serbia in an attempt to exact vengeance for the previous defeat. The Serbian Army was led by Mutimir and his brothers, which defeated the Bulgars, capturing Vladimir and 12 boyars. Boris I and Mutimir agreed to cease hostilities (and perhaps an alliance), and Mutimir sent his sons Bran and Stefan to the border to escort the prisoners, where they exchanged items as a sign of peace. Boris gave them "rich gifts", while he was given "two slaves, two falcons, two dogs, and 80 furs".

An internal conflict among the brothers resulted in Mutimir banishing the two younger brothers to the Bulgarian court. He, however, kept the son of Gojnik, Petar, in his court for political reasons. Petar soon fled to Croatia. The reason for the feud is not known, although it is hypothesized that it was the result of treachery.

Mutimir sent envoys to Byzantine Emperor Basil I, asking him to baptize the lands. He put Serbia under the suzerainty of the Byzantine Empire.

The Saracens attacked Ragusa in 866. The Ragusians asked Basil I for help, which he answered, sending a large fleet with his admiral Niketas Ooryphas. The pagan Narentines sacked a ship with emissaries returning from Constantinople, which enraged Basil I, resulting in him sending a fleet and subsequently subduing them. By 878, all of Dalmatia was under Byzantine rule (Theme of Dalmatia), and most of the land was under the religious jurisdiction of the Ecumenical Patriarchate of Constantinople.

Mutimir died in 891 and was succeeded by his eldest son, Pribislav. He was most likely buried in the Church of Peter and Paul at Ras, as was Petar (r. 892–917). Mutimir and his son Pribislav (as "Preuuisclavo") were apparently entered in the Cividale Gospels, which could indicate Serbian contacts with Aquileia. Serbia's transition to Christianity would, therefore, coincide with similar initiatives by Rome in Moravia and Bosnia-Slavonia (as, incidentally, also in Bulgaria) and suggest a coordinated action in south-eastern Europe originating in Rome.

Christianization

The Serbs were baptized by Constantinopolitan missionaries sent by Basil I, after Mutimir had acknowledged Byzantine suzerainty. Basil may have also sent a bishop. The Christianization was due partly to Byzantine and subsequent Bulgarian influence. It is important to note that at least during the rule of Kotsel of Pannonia (861–874), communications between Serbia and Great Moravia must have been possible. The pope was presumably aware of this fact when planning Methodios' diocese, as well as the fact that the Dalmatian coast was in Byzantine hands as far north as Split. There is a possibility that some Cyrillomethodian pupils reached Serbia in the 870s, perhaps even sent by Methodius himself. Serbia is accounted Christian as of about 870. The lasting Christian identity is evident in the tradition of theophoric names in the next generation of Serb royalty: Petar Gojniković, Stefan Mutimirović and Pavle Branović. Petros and Stephanos are both characteristically Byzantine.

The first Serbian bishopric was founded at the political center at Ras, near modern Novi Pazar on the Ibar river. The initial affiliation is uncertain; it may have been under the subordination of either Split or Durazzo, both then Byzantine. The early church of Saint Apostles Peter and Paul at Ras, can be dated to the 9th–10th century, with the rotunda plan characteristic of first court chapels. The bishopric was established shortly after 871, during the rule of Mutimir, and was part of the general plan of establishing bishoprics in the Slav lands of the Empire, confirmed by the Council of Constantinople in 879–880. The Eparchy of Braničevo was founded in 878 (as a continuation of Viminacium and Horreum Margi).

Mutimir maintained the communion with the Eastern Orthodox Patriarchate of Constantinople when Pope John VIII invited him to recognize the jurisdiction of the bishopric of Sirmium in a letter dated to May 873. The Serbs and Bulgarians subsequently adopted the Old Slavonic liturgy instead of the Greek.

Legacy
In the 1985 film "Boris I" (Борис Първи), about the life of Boris I of Bulgaria, the peace treaty between Mutimir and Boris I is featured.

Notes

References

Sources

 
 
 
 
 Ćorović, Vladimir, Istorija srpskog naroda, Book I, (In Serbian) Electric Book, Rastko Electronic Book, Antikvarneknjige (Cyrillic)
 Drugi Period, IV: Pokrštavanje Južnih Slovena
 
 Ferjančić, B. 1997, "Basile I et la restauration du pouvoir byzantin au IXème siècle", Zbornik radova Vizantološkog instituta, no. 36, pp. 9–30.
 Vizantološki institut SANU (Božidar Ferjančić), „Vizantijski izvori za istoriju naroda Jugoslavije (II tom)“ (fototipsko izdanje originala iz 1957), Beograd 2007

External links
 Steven Runciman, A History of the First Bulgarian Empire, London, 1930.

830s births
891 deaths
Year of birth uncertain
9th-century Serbian monarchs
9th-century rulers in Europe
Vlastimirović dynasty
Eastern Orthodox monarchs
Byzantine people of Slavic descent
People of the Bulgarian–Serbian Wars
Slavic warriors
Christian monarchs